The 800 Heroes Song, also known by the title "China Will Not Perish", is a Chinese patriotic song from the Second Sino-Japanese War.  The song was written to commemorate the heroic efforts of the lone battalion of the National Revolutionary Army in the Defense of Sihang Warehouse during the final stage of the Battle of Shanghai (1937).

After winning the war of resistance against Japan and knowing China was certainly not going to perish, the Kuomintang government changed the title and lyrics to "China Shall be Strong".

Lyrics

See also
Kuomintang
Chiang Kai-shek Memorial Song

External links
Listen to the music on Youtube

Kuomintang
Chinese patriotic songs